Ali Zahid Hamid is a Pakistani politician who has been a member of the National Assembly of Pakistan since August 2018.

Early life and family
Ali Hamid was born to the former Federal Minister Zahid Hamid.

He holds a Singaporean citizenship.

Political career
He was elected to the National Assembly of Pakistan as a candidate of Pakistan Muslim League (N) (PML-N) from Constituency NA-74 (Sialkot-III) in 2018 Pakistani general election. He received 97,235 votes and defeated Chaudhary Ghulam Abbas, a candidate of Pakistan Tehreek-e-Insaf.

References

Living people
Pakistani MNAs 2018–2023
Year of birth missing (living people)
Pakistan Muslim League (N) MNAs
Pakistani emigrants to Singapore
Naturalised citizens of Singapore